A Hokim is head of the local executive authority in the Republic of Uzbekistan. According to paragraph 15 of Article 93 of the Constitution of Uzbekistan, a regional and city Hokim are both appointed and dismissed by the President of the Republic of Uzbekistan on the proposal of the Prime Minister.

Hokims of Regions

Tashkent Region 
 Kozim Tulyaganov (1997 - 2002)
 Rustam Shoabdurakhmanov (September 26, 2001 – April 22, 2005) 
 Abdukahhar Tukhtaev (April 22, 2005- February 18, 2011) 
 Rahmonbek Usmanov (February 18, 2011 - March 16, 2012)

Hokims of Cities

Tashkent City 
 Ummat Mirzakulov (January 12, 2000 – January 29, 2004)
 Kozim Tulyaganov (January 29, 2004 - November 7, 2005)
 Mirzamashrap Cucchi (November 7, 2005 - ?)
 Sodiq Abdullayev (?)
 Ahmad Usmanov ( - February 4, 2016) 
 Sodiq Abdullayev (February 4, 2016 - August 12, 2016)
 Islamdzhan Ergashhodzhaev (Acting) (August 12, 2016 - December 15, 2016)
 Shukurullo Babayev (December 15, 2016 – present)

See also 

 President of Uzbekistan
 List of chairmen of the Parliament of the Republic of Karakalpakstan
 Politics of Uzbekistan

References 

Lists of governors and heads of sub-national entities
Lists of current office-holders of country subdivisions
Lists of current office-holders
Politics of Uzbekistan